The 1996 Southern Conference baseball tournament was held at College Park in Charleston, South Carolina, from April 30 through May 3. Top seeded  won the tournament and earned the Southern Conference's automatic bid to the 1996 NCAA Division I baseball tournament. It was the Eagles first tournament win, having joined the league for the 1991 season. This was the final tournament held at College Park, as Joseph P. Riley Jr. Park opened and hosted the tournament beginning in 1997.

The tournament used a double-elimination format. Only the top eight teams participated, so Marshall was not in the field.

Seeding

Bracket 

* - Indicates extra innings.

All-Tournament Team

References 

Tournament
Southern Conference Baseball Tournament
Southern Conference baseball tournament
Southern Conference baseball tournament
Southern Conference baseball tournament